Emmi Alanen (born 30 April 1991) is a Finnish football midfielder and former wrestler who plays for Swedish Damallsvenskan club Kristianstads DFF.

Career
Before moving to Sweden in 2013, she played for Kokkola F10, Sport-39 Vaasa, FC United Pietarsaari and HJK Helsinki of the Naistenliiga.

Alanen made her senior debut for the Finland women's national football team on 19 June 2010, as a substitute in a 4–1 World Cup qualifying win over Portugal in Vantaa. In June 2013 Alanen was named in national coach Andrée Jeglertz's Finland squad for UEFA Women's Euro 2013. Although Finland were eliminated in the group stage, Alanen's midfield performances attracted the attention of Damallsvenskan club Umeå IK who invited her to train with them.

In addition to football, Lappajärvi-born Alanen was also an international standard wrestler. After a period of injury she decided to focus on football. She joined Växjö DFF from Vittsjö GIK in December 2018.

International goals

References

External links
Profile at Kokkola F10 
Profile at UEFA.com
Profile at Swedish Football Association (SvFF) 
 

1991 births
Living people
Finnish women's footballers
Finnish female sport wrestlers
Damallsvenskan players
Umeå IK players
Helsingin Jalkapalloklubi (women) players
Expatriate women's footballers in Sweden
Kansallinen Liiga players
Kokkola Futis 10 players
FC United (Jakobstad) players
Finland women's international footballers
Finnish expatriate footballers
Women's association football midfielders
Växjö DFF players
Vittsjö GIK players
People from Lappajärvi
Sportspeople from South Ostrobothnia
UEFA Women's Euro 2022 players
21st-century Finnish women